Gilbert Peak ( is located in the Goat Rocks on the border of the Yakama Indian Reservation and Yakima County, in the U.S. state of Washington. Situated partly in the Goat Rocks Wilderness, Gilbert Peak is the highest summit in the Goat Rocks, which are the eroded remnants of an extinct stratovolcano. Meade Glacier is located on the southeastern slopes of the peak, while Conrad Glacier is on the north slope.

References

Gallery

Mountains of Washington (state)
Goat Rocks
Mountains of Yakima County, Washington